Allais is a French surname. Notable people with the surname include:

 Alphonse Allais (1854–1905), French writer and humorist
 David Allais (born 1933), American businessman and inventor
 Émile Allais (1912–2012), French alpine ski racer
 Jean-Jacques Allais (born 1969), French professional footballer
 Lucy Allais, philosopher
 Maurice Allais (1911–2010), French economist
 Nicolas Viton de Saint-Allais (1773–1842), French genealogist and littérateur
 Pierre Allais (c. 1700–1782), French painter and pastel artist

See also
 Allais, Kentucky, unincorporated community and coal town in Perry County, Kentucky, United States
 Allai, disambiguation
 Allais effect, claimed anomalous precession of the plane of oscillation of a pendulum during a solar eclipse
 Allais paradox, choice problem designed by Maurice Allais

French-language surnames